The Principlists, also interchangeably known as the Iranian Conservatives and formerly referred to as the Right or Right-wing, are one of two main political camps inside post-revolutionary Iran, the other being Reformists. The term hardliners that some western sources use in the Iranian political context usually refers to the faction, although the principlist camp also includes more centrist tendencies.

The camp rejects the status quo internationally, but tends to preserve it domestically.

Within Iranian politics, a principlist refers to the conservative supporters of the Supreme Leader of Iran and advocates for protecting the ideological "principles" of the Islamic Revolution's early days. According to Hossein Mousavian, "The Principlists constitute the main right-wing/conservative political movement in Iran. They are more religiously oriented and more closely affiliated with the Qom-based clerical establishment than their moderate and reformist rivals".

A declaration issued by The Two Societies, which serves as the Principlists "manifesto", focuses on loyalty to Islam and the Iranian Revolution, obedience to the Supreme Leader of Iran, and devotion to the principle of Vilayat Faqih.

According to a poll conducted by the Iranian Students Polling Agency (ISPA) in April 2017, 15% of Iranians identify as leaning Principlist. In comparison, 28% identify as leaning Reformist.

The Principlists currently dominate the Assembly of Experts, as well as non-elective institutions such as the Guardian Council, the Expediency Discernment Council, and the Judiciary.

Factions
Ultra conservatives—also known as neoconservatives—consists of laymen representing the Islamic Revolutionary Guard Corps (IRGC) collectively. These conservatives support the Islamist government and are more aggressive and openly confrontational toward the West.
Traditional conservatives are a political faction that helped form the Revolutionary government and can point to personal ties with Ruhollah Khomeini. These conservatives support the Islamist government and advocate for clerical rule.

Election results

Presidential elections

Parties and organizations

Alliances 
 The Two Societies (Unofficial)
 Front of Followers of the Line of the Imam and the Leader (founded in the 1990s)
 Coordination Council of Islamic Revolution Forces (founded 2000)
 Front of Transformationalist Principlists (founded 2005)
 Resistance Front of Islamic Iran (founded 2011)
 Popular Front of Islamic Revolution Forces (founded 2016)
Electoral
 Alliance of Builders of Islamic Iran (2003, 2004)
 Coalition of Iran's Independent Volunteers (2004)
 Coalition of the Pleasant Scent of Servitude (2006)
 Principlists Pervasive Coalition (2008)
 United Front of Principlists (2008, 2012)
 Insight and Islamic Awakening Front (2012)
 Principlists Grand Coalition (2016)
 Service list (2017)

Media 
Kayhan
Resalat
Vatan-e-Emrooz
Abrar
Yalasarat
Partow-e Sokhan
Rajanews

See also 
 Islamic fundamentalism in Iran

References

External links

Politics of Iran
History of the Islamic Republic of Iran
Political factions in Iran
Political neologisms
Islamism in Iran
Right-wing politics in Asia
Conservatism in Iran
Theocrats
Euphemisms